KPAE (91.5 MHz) is a radio station broadcasting a Christian radio format. Licensed to Erwinville, Louisiana, United States. The station is currently owned by Port Allen Educational Broadcasting Foundation and features programming from Salem Radio Network.

Programming is simulcast with co-owned 89.7 WPAE, an FM station in Centreville, Mississippi.

References

External links

Christian radio stations in Louisiana
Moody Radio affiliate stations